Steve Carell is an American actor, comedian, writer, producer, and director, who has received various accolades throughout his career, including a Golden Globe Award, three Screen Actors Guild Awards and two Writers Guild of America Awards. Additionally, he has been nominated for an Academy Award, eleven Primetime Emmy Awards, and a BAFTA Award. In 2016, Carell received a star on the Hollywood Walk of Fame for his contributions to motion pictures.

Major associations

Academy Awards

BAFTA Awards

Golden Globe Awards

Primetime Emmy Awards

Screen Actors Guild Awards

Writers Guild of America Awards

Other awards

AACTA Awards

AARP Movies for Grownups Awards

American Comedy Awards

Annie Awards

Critics' Choice Movie Awards

Critics' Choice Television Awards

Dorian Awards

Film Independent Spirit Awards

Gotham Awards

Hollywood Film Awards

Irish Film & Television Academy Awards

Kids' Choice Awards

MTV Movie Awards

People's Choice Awards

Satellite Awards

Teen Choice Awards

Festivals

Monte-Carlo Television Festival

Palm Springs International Film Festival

Santa Barbara International Film Festival

Critics groups

Alliance of Women Film Journalists

Dublin Film Critics' Circle

National Board of Review

New York Film Critics Circle

St. Louis Film Critics Association

Television Critics Association

Vancouver Film Critics Circle

Washington D.C. Area Film Critics Association

Notes

References

External links
 

Carell, Steve